Moorside is a housing estate near Backworth and Shiremoor. It consists of a large housing estate, a few shops and a veterinary practice.

There is a Catholic church located in Moorside, although it is usually stated as being situated in Backworth.

In the early 2000s, a new community was built over the road from Moorside. It is called Northumberland Park.

References

Populated places in Tyne and Wear
Metropolitan Borough of North Tyneside